Guoyu or Guo Yu may refer to:

Standard Chinese, a standardized variety of spoken Mandarin Chinese usually called Putonghua in Mainland China
Taiwanese Mandarin, the related standardized variety of Mandarin in Taiwan 
Guoyu (book), a classical history book of ancient China
Cheng Rui (died 903), Tang dynasty warlord known as Guo Yu at one point